In number theory and harmonic analysis, the Landsberg–Schaar relation (or identity) is the following equation, which is valid for arbitrary positive integers p and q:

The standard way to prove it is to put  =  + ε, where ε > 0 in this identity due to Jacobi (which is essentially just a special case of the Poisson summation formula in classical harmonic analysis):

and then let ε → 0.

A proof using only finite methods was discovered in 2018 by Ben Moore.

If we let q = 1, the identity reduces to a formula for the quadratic Gauss sum modulo p.

The Landsberg–Schaar identity can be rephrased more symmetrically as

provided that we add the hypothesis that pq is an even number.

References

Theorems in analytic number theory